The Sind woodpecker (Dendrocopos assimilis) is a species of bird in the family Picidae. It is native to Pakistan, India and southern Iran.

Description
Sind woodpeckers are similar to Syrian woodpecker in appearance, with former being smaller in size, with thin mustache and excessive white feathers on their back and smaller beak. Sind woodpeckers have white shoulder patches and bars on its black feathers. It is the only black and white woodpecker in its region.

Distribution and diet
The woodpecker is a resident bird and native to Pakistan, India and southern Iran. They have moderate forest reliance and can be found up to the altitude of 2,200 meters, they are also found in rural gardens and plantations. Naturally they are found in tropical and subtropical dry forests, riverine forests, thorny shrub-lands, dry scrub-lands and wetlands like freshwater springs and oases.

They are non-migratory birds, with mostly population dispersing after breeding locally.

The Sind woodpecker's diet mostly consist of insects, including woodboring beetles, larvae, spiders and ants.

Reproduction
The breeding season occurs between March and April. These species are monogamous, meaning both the parents raise the young ones and nest in tree holes excavated by the breeding pair. They lay about 3 to 5 eggs, with both the parents incubating them. The chicks hatch after 12 days of incubation and fledgling occurs after 20 days. The juvenile disperse to new location.

Status
The global population of the Sind woodpecker has not been evaluated. The general population of the species is stable. In the greater part of its range, this Sind woodpecker species is accounted for to be locally common. The age length is 5.2 years. Its distribution size is around 1,490,000 square km. Deforestation is a main threat to the species.

References

Sind woodpecker
Birds of Pakistan
Birds of Sindh